Gilroy is a surname of Scottish origin which means "a king's servant." 

Bert Gilroy (1899–1973), American film producer 
Beryl Gilroy (1924–2001), British novelist and teacher
Craig Gilroy (born 1991) Irish rugby union player
Dan Gilroy (born 1959), American film director and screenwriter 
E. A. Gilroy (Edward Albert Gilroy; 1879–1942), Canadian ice hockey administrator
Frank D. Gilroy (1925–2015), American playwright, screenwriter, film producer and director
Freddie Gilroy (1936–2016), Northern Irish Olympic boxer
Henry Gilroy, American television screenwriter and producer
Henry Gilroy (baseball), (1852–1907) Major League Baseball catcher
Jackie Gilroy (1942–2007), former Gaelic footballer 
John Gilroy (disambiguation)
 John Gilroy (artist) (1898–1985), English illustrator known for Guinness advertisements
 John Gilroy (baseball) (1875–1897), baseball player
 John Gilroy (film editor) (born 1959), brother of Tony Gilroy
 John Gilroy (politician) (born 1967), Irish Labour Party Senator
 John Brodie Gilroy (1818–1853), English songwriter
 Johnny Gilroy (1896–1952), American football halfback
Keith Gilroy (born 1983), Irish former professional footballer
Linda Gilroy (born 1949), British Labour Co-operative politician
Matt Gilroy (born 1984),  American professional ice hockey defenseman
Norman Thomas Gilroy (1896–1977), Australian Roman Catholic cardinal
Pat Gilroy (born 1971), former Gaelic footballer and manager
Paul Gilroy (born 1956), English academician
Sue Anne Gilroy (born 1948), American politician, Secretary of State of Indiana
Thomas F. Gilroy (1840–1911), American politician, 89th mayor of New York City
Tom Gilroy, American writer, director, producer, and actor 
Tony Gilroy (born 1956), American screenwriter and filmmaker

Fictional characters
Alec Gilroy, fictional character from the British soap opera Coronation Street
Bet Gilroy, fictional character from the British soap opera Coronation Street; wife of Alec

References

Surnames of Scottish origin